Peace of Mind is the debut studio album by Canadian rapper Jay Whiss released via Universal Music Canada. After released a 3 track EP which contained the single "Every Night" which features vocals from Jimmy Prime and Safe and "Dark Cloud" it was said to be served as a prequel to this album. The PE included the single  "Dark Cloud" which was also confirmed to be the first single on the album. Peace of Mind was released on March 3, 2020, and was also supported by the singles "Valet" featuring Puffy L'z, "Lay Low" featuring Donnie and "Mind in a Maze". The album received an 8/10 rating by Exclaim!.

Background
During the month of December in 2019, Whiss announced that his debut album Peace of Mind is slated for a release in early 2020 and will be titled Peace of Mind. The lead single of the album "Valet" was released on December 3, 2020, and featured vocals from Puffy L'z and was produced by Murda Beatz. The album was also supported by another Murda Beatz produced track titled "Lay Low" featured Donnie was released and on February 6, 2020. The album was officially released on March 3, 2020, and also saw a vocal appearance from Jimmy Prime on the song "Left Me For Dead". Whiss also released visuals for the song "Mind in a Maze" on the same day of the album release. A song he describes as his favorite song ever made, going on to say that "It's not just a song; it's literally me."

Critical reception
Peace of Mind was met with generally positive reviews. The album received an 8/10 rating by Kyle Mullin of Exclaim!, who outlined Whiss as an artist who balances such "hood hedonism with genuinely thoughtful bars that make for a well-rounded listen" and a powerful solo debut from the artist. HotNewHipHop'''s Aron A., described Peace Of Mind as a raw and unfiltered portrayal of Jay Whiss as a person and the city that raised him. Giving the album a 5 star rating.

Track listing

Personnel
Credits for Peace of Mind'' adapted from AllMusic.

Jay Whiss – Primary artist, composer
Donnie – Featured artist, composer
Puffy L'z – Featured artist, composer 
Jimmy Prime – Featured artist, composer
1Mind – Producer
Chris Athens – Mastering engineer
Murda Beatz – Producer
Damian Birdsey – Engineer, producer
Lani Christ – Producer
Cubeatz – Producer
Amir Jammalieh – Engineer, mastering engineer, mixing, producer
Pro Logic – Engineer, producer
Richie Souf – Producer

References

Jay Whiss albums
2020 debut albums
Universal Music Canada albums